Allied Broadcasting Center is a Philippine radio network. Its corporate office is located at Unit 1703, Cityland 10, Tower 1, H.V. De la Costa St., Makati. It is a subsidiary of Apollo Broadcast Investors.

ABC Stations
Source:

AM Stations

FM Stations

Former Stations

References

Philippine radio networks